Edgardo Bauza (born 26 January 1958) is an Argentine football manager and former player who played as a defender. Before taking up management, he played over 300 games for Rosario Central. He also played for Independiente in Argentina, Atlético Junior in Colombia and Veracruz in Mexico.

As a manager, Bauza has coached several South American sides, mainly in Argentina, but also teams in Peru, Ecuador, and Brazil, as well as Saudi club Al-Nassr, and the Argentina, United Arab Emirates, and Saudi Arabia national teams.

Managerial career

In 2008, Bauza made history by becoming the first manager ever to lead an Ecuadorian club to victory in an international tournament, winning that year's Copa Libertadores. His team included three Argentine players (Damián Manso, Claudio Bieler and Norberto Araujo), along with Paraguayan midfielder Enrique Vera, strong wingers Luis Bolaños and Joffre Guerrón and veteran goalkeeper and penalty shootout hero José Francisco Cevallos. He resigned after losing the 2008 FIFA Club World Cup to Manchester United.

On January 15, 2009, the IFFHS ranked him third among the top ten club coaches around the world, only behind Sir Alex Ferguson and Dick Advocaat. He was also voted the 2008 South American Coach of the Year by Uruguayan newspaper El País. After a spell with Saudi Arabian side Al-Nassr FC, Bauza returned to LDU Quito in December 2009, replacing 2009 Copa Sudamericana-winning manager Jorge Fossati. He lost the 2011 Copa Sudamericana finals to Universidad de Chile.

In 2013, he joined San Lorenzo de Almagro of the Argentine Primera División, where he led the club to its first ever Copa Libertadores title in 2014. He subsequently signed with São Paulo FC from Brazil on December 17, 2015. President of club, Carlos Augusto de Barros e Silva, said the following words: "I am very happy for signing with a winning coach [...]".

After just one season in Brazil, Bauza was appointed as the new manager of the Argentina national team, on 11 August 2016. He was relieved of his duties on 11 April 2017 with the Albiceleste placed fifth in CONMEBOL World Cup qualifying, with only four teams guaranteed a qualification spot.

He was appointed as the head coach of United Arab Emirates national football team in May the same year, but narrowly failed to take the team to qualify for the World Cup, with a record of two wins, one draw and one defeat in his tenure. After only four months he resigned from the post to join Saudi Arabia in September. He was sacked from the Saudi Arabian team on 22 November.

He was appointed manager of Rosario Central in May 2018. 
Bauza guided Rosario Central to win the Copa Argentina 2018.
After a period with bad results, Rosario decided to fire Bauza on 23 February 2019.

Personal life
In 19 May 2022, it was revealed via a argentine radio that Bauza was suffering from advanced Alzheimer's disease.

Honours

Copa Libertadores: 2014, 2008
FIFA Club World Cup runner-up: 2014, 2008
Recopa Sudamericana: 2010, runner-up: 2015
Copa Sudamericana runner-up: Copa Sudamericana 2011
Ecuadorian Serie A: 2010
Copa Argentina: 2018

References

External links

 
 

1958 births
Living people
People from Rosario Department
Rosario Central footballers
Atlético Junior footballers
Club Atlético Independiente footballers
C.D. Veracruz footballers
Association football defenders
Argentine footballers
1990 FIFA World Cup players
Argentine Primera División players
Liga MX players
Categoría Primera A players
Argentine expatriate footballers
Expatriate footballers in Colombia
Expatriate footballers in Mexico
Expatriate football managers in Brazil
Expatriate football managers in Ecuador
Expatriate football managers in Peru
Expatriate football managers in Saudi Arabia
Argentina international footballers
Argentine football managers
Argentine expatriate football managers
Rosario Central managers
Club Atlético Vélez Sarsfield managers
Club Atlético Colón managers
Sporting Cristal managers
L.D.U. Quito managers
Al Nassr FC managers
San Lorenzo de Almagro managers
São Paulo FC managers
Campeonato Brasileiro Série A managers
Saudi Professional League managers
Argentina national football team managers
United Arab Emirates national football team managers
Saudi Arabia national football team managers
Argentine expatriate sportspeople in Peru
Argentine expatriate sportspeople in Saudi Arabia
Argentine expatriate sportspeople in the United Arab Emirates
Argentine expatriate sportspeople in Brazil
Sportspeople from Santa Fe Province